Dezső Wein or Desiderius Wein (also known as Dezső Boros; January 19, 1873 – June 5, 1944) was a Hungarian doctor and gymnast, who competed at the 1896 Summer Olympics in Athens. Wein competed in the parallel bars, horizontal bar, vault, and rings individual events.  He did not win medals in any of those competitions, though his exact ranking in each is unknown.

References

Sources
  (Excerpt available at )

External links
 
 Magyar Életrajzi Lexikon

1873 births
1944 deaths
Gymnasts from Budapest
Gymnasts at the 1896 Summer Olympics
19th-century sportsmen
Hungarian male artistic gymnasts
Olympic gymnasts of Hungary
20th-century Hungarian physicians